Sámuel Teleki may refer to:

 Sámuel Teleki (chancellor) (1739–1822), Chancellor of Transylvania
 Sámuel Teleki (explorer) (1845–1916), Hungarian explorer, grandson of above